is a Japanese manga artist best known for creating Tokyo Underground. Uraku won one of two grand prizes (the other winner being Diachiken Ise) at the 4th Enix 21st Century Manga Awards in 1997 for his work Yojō Mahō Shoriban. This story was later published in the February 1997 issue of Monthly G Fantasy.

In 2002, Tokyo Underground was adapted into an anime television series aired on TV Tokyo. Uraku made a cameo appearance as a student in the first episode of that series.

Works
 (1997, Monthly G Fantasy)
Tokyo Underground (14 volumes, January 1998 – March 2005, Monthly Shōnen Gangan)
Onikirisama no Hakoirimusume (irregularly since July 2006 issue of Monthly Shōnen Gangan till November 2010 issue, all 4 volumes Tankōbon)

References

External links
Profile of Tokyo Underground on absoluteanime.com
Gangan Square Enix

1977 births
Living people
Manga artists from Hyōgo Prefecture